The Public Record is a free weekly tabloid newspaper, published in Philadelphia, Pennsylvania since 1999.  The editorial matter is local and state politics, labor unions, schools and community organization news. The advertising matter is by labor unions, businesses, candidates for public office, elected officials, and official city notices such as legal notices by the courts, election notices and Philadelphia Sheriff's sales.

History
The Public Record began publication in September 1999 as a semi-monthly, and changed to a weekly in April, 2000.

The publisher of the Public Record was James Tayoun, Sr. who was a former City Councilman in Philadelphia and State Representative in Harrisburg who resigned from office after pleading guilty to racketeering, mail-fraud, tax- evasion and obstruction-of-justice.

In 2010, the Public Record announced a new sister publication, "The South Philadelphia Public Record."

See also

 List of newspapers in Pennsylvania

References

Newspapers published in Philadelphia
Publications established in 1999